The Eritrean Orthodox Tewahedo Church is part of the Oriental Orthodox communion, and it was granted autocephaly by Shenouda III, Pope of the Coptic Orthodox Church, in 1994 — a year after Eritrea gained its independence from Ethiopia. Shenouda III ordained five Eritrean high-ranking clergy as Bishops of the Eritrean Orthodox Tewahedo Church on 19 June 1994 in Saint Mark's Coptic Orthodox Cathedral in Cairo, Egypt. This would allow the formation of a local Holy Synod for Eritrea. Shenouda III also agreed that a newly elected Patriarch would be able to consecrate on his own new bishops and metropolitans for the Eritrean Church. The Patriarch of Eritrea also carries the title of Abuna in line with the Ethiopian Orthodox Tewahedo Church.

After declaration of autocephaly of the church in 1994, the position of Patriarch of Eritrea remained vacant until 1999 when Phillipos became the first Patriarch of the Eritrean Orthodox Tewahedo Church.

Patriarchs of Eritrea

Timeline

See also
 Coptic Christianity
 List of abunas of Ethiopia

References

Lists of Eritrean people
 
 
Eritrea
Eritrea